The following is a list of all official Tree City USA cities in Ohio.  Ohio has 248 Tree Cities holding the number 1 position in the United States for over 20 years for most Tree Cities.  Ohio's first tree cities were Springfield, Wooster, and Westerville which all joined in 1977.

Cities

A
Ada, Ohio
Akron, Ohio
Alliance, Ohio
Amanda, Ohio
Amberley Village, Ohio
Amsterdam, Ohio
Archbold, Ohio
Ashland, Ohio
Athens, Ohio
Attica, Ohio
Aurora, Ohio
Avon Lake, Ohio

B
Baltic, Ohio
Baltimore, Ohio
Bay Village, Ohio
Beachwood, Ohio
Bedford, Ohio
Bedford Heights, Ohio
Belle Center, Ohio
Bellefontaine, Ohio
Bellevue, Ohio
Bellville, Ohio
Belpre, Ohio
Berea, Ohio
Bexley, Ohio
Bloomdale, Ohio
Bloomville, Ohio
Bluffton, Ohio
Bolivar, Ohio
Bowling Green, Ohio
Brecksville, Ohio
Brewster, Ohio
Broadview Heights, Ohio
Brooklyn, Ohio
Brunswick, Ohio
Bryan, Ohio
Burton, Ohio

C
Cambridge, Ohio
Canal Winchester, Ohio
Canfield, Ohio
Cardington, Ohio
Carey, Ohio
Centerburg, Ohio
Centerville, Ohio
Chagrin Falls, Ohio
Chardon, Ohio
Chillicothe, Ohio
Cincinnati, Ohio
Cleveland, Ohio
Cleveland Heights, Ohio
Clyde, Ohio
Coldwater, Ohio
Columbus, Ohio
Columbus Grove, Ohio
Conneaut, Ohio
Creston, Ohio
Cridersville, Ohio
Cuyahoga Falls, Ohio

D
Dalton, Ohio
Dayton, Ohio
Defiance, Ohio
Delaware, Ohio
Dover, Ohio
Doylestown, Ohio
Dublin, Ohio
Dupont, Ohio

E
East Palestine, Ohio
Eastlake, Ohio
Edgerton, Ohio
Elmore, Ohio
Elyria, Ohio
Euclid, Ohio

F
Fairfield, Ohio
Fairport Harbor, Ohio
Fairview Park, Ohio
Findlay, Ohio
Forest Park, Ohio
Fostoria, Ohio
Fredericktown, Ohio
Fremont, Ohio

G
Gahanna, Ohio
Galion, Ohio
Gallipolis, Ohio
Garfield Heights, Ohio
Genoa, Ohio
Gibsonburg, Ohio
Glendale, Ohio
Grandview Heights, Ohio
Granville, Ohio
Greenhills, Ohio
Grove City, Ohio
Groveport, Ohio

H
Hamilton, Ohio
Harrisburg, Ohio
Hartville, Ohio
Hilliard, Ohio
Holgate, Ohio
Holland, Ohio
Hoytville, Ohio
Hudson, Ohio

I
Independence, Ohio

J
Jackson, Ohio
Jenera, Ohio

K
Kent, Ohio
Kenton, Ohio
Kettering, Ohio

L
Lakewood, Ohio
Lancaster, Ohio
Larue, Ohio
Lebanon, Ohio
Leetonia, Ohio
Leipsic, Ohio
Lexington, Ohio
Lima, Ohio
Lindsey, Ohio
Lisbon, Ohio
Lockland, Ohio
London, Ohio
Loudonville, Ohio
Louisville, Ohio
Loveland, Ohio

M
Macedonia, Ohio
Malvern, Ohio
Mansfield, Ohio
Mantua, Ohio
Maple Heights, Ohio
Mariemont, Ohio
Marietta, Ohio
Marysville, Ohio
Mason, Ohio
Massillon, Ohio
Maumee, Ohio
Medina, Ohio
Mentor, Ohio
Miamisburg, Ohio
Middlefield, Ohio
Milan, Ohio
Milford, Ohio
Minerva, Ohio
Minster, Ohio
Monroeville, Ohio
Montgomery, Ohio
Montpelier, Ohio
Moraine, Ohio
Mount Gilead, Ohio
Mount Vernon, Ohio
Munroe Falls, Ohio

N
Napoleon, Ohio
Navarre, Ohio
New Bremen, Ohio
New Concord, Ohio
New Lexington, Ohio
New London, Ohio
New Philadelphia, Ohio
New Richmond, Ohio
New Washington, Ohio
Newburgh Heights, Ohio
North Baltimore, Ohio
North Olmsted, Ohio
Northwood, Ohio
Norwalk, Ohio

O
Oak Harbor, Ohio
Oakwood, Montgomery County, Ohio
Oberlin, Ohio
Olmsted Falls, Ohio
Ontario, Ohio
Oregon, Ohio
Orrville, Ohio
Ottawa, Ohio
Oxford, Ohio

P
Parma Heights, Ohio
Pemberville, Ohio
Pepper Pike, Ohio
Perry, Ohio
Perrysburg, Ohio
Perrysville, Ohio
Pickerington, Ohio
Piqua, Ohio
Plymouth, Ohio
Port Clinton, Ohio
Portsmouth, Ohio
Powell, Ohio

R
Ravenna, Ohio
Reynoldsburg, Ohio
Richfield, Ohio
Richmond Heights, Ohio
Ripley, Ohio
Rittman, Ohio
Rockford, Ohio
Rocky River, Ohio
Rossford, Ohio

S
Salem, Ohio
Sandusky, Ohio
Shaker Heights, Ohio
Shelby, Ohio
Shreve, Ohio
Sidney, Ohio
Silver Lake, Ohio
Silverton, Ohio
Smithville, Ohio
Solon, Ohio
South Bloomfield, Ohio
South Euclid, Ohio
Springboro, Ohio
Springdale, Ohio
Springfield, Ohio
St. Clairsville, Ohio
St. Marys, Ohio
Stow, Ohio
Strongsville, Ohio
Sugarcreek, Ohio
Sylvania, Ohio

T
Terrace Park, Ohio
Tiffin, Ohio
Tipp City, Ohio
Toledo, Ohio
Troy, Ohio
Twinsburg, Ohio

U
Union City, Ohio
University Heights, Ohio
Upper Arlington, Ohio
Upper Sandusky, Ohio
Urbana, Ohio

V
Versailles, Ohio

W
Wadsworth, Ohio
Wapakoneta, Ohio
Washington Court House, Ohio
Waterville, Ohio
Wauseon, Ohio
Wayne, Ohio
Waynesburg, Ohio
Waynesville, Ohio
Wellington, Ohio
Wellston, Ohio
Wellsville, Ohio
West Carrollton, Ohio
West Salem, Ohio
West Unity, Ohio
Westerville, Ohio
Westlake, Ohio
Wickliffe, Ohio
Willard, Ohio
Williamsburg, Ohio
Willoughby, Ohio
Woodmere, Ohio
Woodville, Ohio
Wooster, Ohio
Worthington, Ohio
Wright-Patterson AFB, Ohio
Wyoming, Ohio

Y
Youngstown, Ohio

Z
Zanesville, Ohio
Zoar, Ohio

See also
Tree City USA
List of Tree Cities USA

References

Tree Cities
Environment of Ohio
Geography of Ohio
Ohio